Paraguayans in Spain are the people born in Paraguay who emigrated to Spain. As of 2020, there were about 87,045 Paraguayans living in Spain.

Notable people

See also
Paraguay–Spain relations

References

Immigration to Spain
Ethnic groups in Spain
 
Spain